Niccolò Piccinni (16 January 1728 – 7 May 1800) was an Italian composer of symphonies, sacred music, chamber music, and opera. Although he is somewhat obscure today, Piccinni was one of the most popular composers of opera—particularly the Neapolitan opera buffa—of the Classical period.

Life 
Piccinni was born in Bari, in the Apulia region. From the age of fourteen, he was educated at the S. Onofrio Conservatory by Leonardo Leo and Francesco Durante, thanks to the intervention of the Bishop of Bari (his father, although himself a musician, was opposed to his son following the same career).

Piccinni's first opera, Le donne dispettose, was produced in 1755 with the patronage of Prince Vintimille. In 1760 he composed, at Rome, the chef d'œuvre of his early life, La Cecchina, ossia la buona Figliuola, an opera buffa with a libretto by Goldoni, which "enjoyed a two-year run in Rome and was played in all the important European capitals. It can probably be called the most popular opera buffa of the 18th century...[even more than]... Pergolesi's La serva padrona...[and]... The first of the new era, culminating in the masterworks of Mozart."

La buona figliuola represents a special moment in the history of eighteenth-century music in which comedy began to take on a new dramatic force.  It is the moment at which the self-consciously sentimental theatrical project of Carlo Goldoni (the opera's librettist) is married with the developing musical language of classicism.  This can especially be seen in the sensitive writing of Cecchina's Act II aria "Una povera ragazza."

The opera was such a success that fashions of dress, shops, and houses were all named after La Cecchina.  It also set off a debate about the merits of the new sentimental style, especially in England, where conservative reactionaries were wary of the supposed feminizing influence of modern Italian music.  Antonio Baretti commented in 1768 that individuals “of weight and consideration” should not be blamed for condemning “those puny gentlemen” who, as enthusiasts of Italian opera, were able to “feel its minuet niceties, and to be of course in rapture with the languishing Cecchina’s of Piccini .” This modern music, Baretti decried, “far from having any power of increasing courage or any manly virtues, has on the contrary a tendency towards effeminacy and cowardliness.”

Six years after this, Piccinni was invited by Queen Marie Antoinette to Paris. He became the first Italian after Jean-Baptiste Lully to write operas for the Academie Royale de Musique, as the opera was called. He collaborated with the poet and dramatist Marmontel on several projects designed to advance the cause of the operatic reform.  Marmontel's first librettos took, as their foundation, texts Philippe Quinault had written for Lully, Roland 1778, and Atys, 1779. Subsequent works, starting with Didon, used original texts.  All his later works were successful; but the directors of the Grand Opera conceived the idea of deliberately opposing him to Gluck, by persuading the two composers to treat the same subject – Iphigénie en Tauride – simultaneously. The Parisian public was divided into two rival parties, which, under the names of Gluckists and Piccinnists, carried on an unworthy and disgraceful war. Gluck's masterly Iphigénie en Tauride was first produced on 18 May 1779. Piccinni's Iphigénie followed on 23 January 1781. The antagonism of the rival parties continued, even after Gluck left  Paris in 1780; and an attempt was afterwards made to inaugurate a new rivalry with Sacchini.  Piccinni remained popular, and on the death of Gluck, in 1787, proposed that a public monument be erected to his memory— a suggestion which the Gluckists refused to support.

In 1784 Piccinni became professor at the Royal School of Music, one of the institutions from which the Conservatoire was formed in 1794. On the outbreak of the French Revolution in 1789, Piccinni returned to Naples, where he was at first well received by King Ferdinand IV; but the marriage of his daughter Claire to a French democrat named Pierre Prades-Prestreau brought him disgrace – he was accused of being a  revolutionary and placed under house arrest for four years. For the next nine years he maintained a precarious existence in Venice, Naples and Rome; but he returned in 1798 to Paris, where the public received him with enthusiasm, but he made no money.  He died in Passy, near Paris. During his life, he worked with the greatest librettists of his age, including Metastasio. After his death a memorial tablet was set up in the house in which he was born at Bari.

He had married in 1756 his pupil Vincenza Sibilla, a singer, whom he never allowed to appear on the stage after their marriage. A grandson, Louis Alexandre Piccinni, became a successful repetiteur and composer in Paris.

Works

The most complete list of his works was given in the Rivista Musicale Italiana, viii. 75.

Operas

Piccinni produced over a hundred operas, but although his later work shows the influence of the French and German stage, he belongs to the conventional Italian school of the 18th century.

Non-operatic works
Piccinni also wrote a number of sacred works, for voices with various accompanying forces, and also two symphonies (in D major and in G major) and a flute concerto.

See also
 Les Neuf Sœurs

Notes

References
 
 
 Pierre-Louis Ginguené, Notice sur la vie et les ouvrages de Niccolo Piccinni (Paris, 1801).

External links

 
 
 Istituto Internazionale per lo studio del '700 musicale napoletano www.domenicoscarlatti.it

1728 births
1800 deaths
18th-century Italian male musicians
Italian Classical-period composers
Neapolitan school composers
18th-century Italian composers
Italian male classical composers
Italian opera composers
Italian musicians
Male opera composers
People from Bari